The Drumheller Dragons are a junior A ice hockey team based in Drumheller, Alberta, Canada, with home games at  Drumheller Memorial Arena.  They are members of the Alberta Junior Hockey League, which is a member of the Canadian Junior Hockey League.

History
The Drumheller Dragons entered the Alberta Junior Hockey League (AJHL) as an expansion team in the 2003–04 season and are the second franchise to represent the town of Drumheller following the Drumheller Falcons from 1979 to 1983.

Season-by-season records
Note: GP = Games played, W = Wins, L = Losses, T/OTL = Ties and overtime losses, Pts = Points, GF = Goals for, GA = Goals against

See also
 List of ice hockey teams in Alberta
 Drumheller Miners

References

External links
Drumheller Dragons website
Alberta Junior Hockey League website

Alberta Junior Hockey League teams
Ice hockey teams in Alberta
Ice hockey clubs established in 2003
Drumheller
2003 establishments in Alberta